Joshua Pim and Frank Stoker defeated Herbert Baddeley and Wilfred Baddeley 6–2, 4–6, 6–3, 5–7, 6–2 in the All Comers' Final, and then defeated the reigning champions Harry Barlow and Ernest Lewis 4–6, 6–3, 6–1, 2–6, 6–0 in the challenge round to win the gentlemen's doubles tennis title at the 1893 Wimbledon Championships.

Draw

Challenge round

All Comers'

References

External links

Gentlemen's Doubles
Wimbledon Championship by year – Men's doubles